George Emmanuel Mylonas (Γεώργιος Εμμανουήλ Μυλωνάς, 9 December 1898, in Smyrna (now Izmir, Turkey) – 15 April 1988, Greece) was a prominent Greek and Aegean archaeologist.

Early life
While a student in Athens during the Greco–Turkish War of 1919–1922, he joined the Greek Army and was later taken prisoner. While a prisoner of war he lost enough weight that the permanent ID band on his wrist was easily taken on and off and exchanged with other prisoners. His future wife fled Asia Minor with only her tennis racket and spent the war living with family friends in Greece.

Mylonas was in Smyrna when the city was destroyed by the Turks in late September 1922. He remarked that the family silver was saved for him by a Turkish neighbor, though the rest of the family home, with the artwork, was confiscated by the government and never repatriated.

Academic career
Following the war, he returned to his studies (he had been awarded his B.A. from the International College in Smyrna in 1918) and earned a doctorate from the University of Athens in 1927 with a dissertation entitled The Neolithic Period in Greece. About this time he also worked as bursar at the American School of Classical Studies at Athens. In 1928 he emigrated to America to study at Johns Hopkins University and from that institution received a second Ph.D. the following year. At Johns Hopkins he was a student of David Moore Robinson. He was married to Lela, both of them having been born in Asia Minor.

Before being naturalized as a U.S. citizen in 1937, Mylonas began teaching at Washington University in St. Louis where he remained from 1933 to 1968. There he was the founding chair of the Department of Art History and Archaeology. A former student who arrived at the school in 1961 recalled that Mylonas was a "marvelous teacher"; by then he had been awarded the title of "Distinguished Professor" in the Arts and Sciences. He also taught at the University of Illinois and the University of Chicago, and during the Second World War he worked for the Greek War Relief Organization. He renounced his American citizenship to avoid conflict issues as to allocation of archeological sites and status during the same time as the Vietnam War, which led to some of his American relatives being denied security clearances.

For many years Mylonas directed Washington University's excavations at Mycenae. After retiring from teaching in 1968, he returned to Greece where he served as Secretary General of the Archaeological Society of Athens and managed the dig at Mycenae until his death. In these later years he was very active in efforts to protect the Athenian Acropolis from environmental pollution.

In Old Phaleron/Acromycenae, where he lived, in addition to bringing tourists, he researched and restored the old spring that had served the area for thousands of years, bringing water to the local area. The valve for the spring was in his back yard and for a time his wife undertook the duty of making certain that the water flowed every night.

Mylonas is well known for his fieldwork at Olynthus as well as investigations at Mycenae, Nemea, Corinth and Eleusis. During 1951 and 1952, he led the important excavation of Grave Circle B at Mycenae (c. 1650-1550 BCE, Middle Helladic III to Late Helladic I), and succeeded in establishing that it pre-dated Heinrich Schliemann's Grave Circle A.

He also briefly appeared in parts one and four of Michael Wood's televised series, In Search of the Trojan War (1985). In an interview conducted at the citadel of Mycenae, Mylonas, with a chuckle and a twinkle in his eye, speaks of Agamemnon, with whom he converses "all the time". He once said that the task of the archaeologist was to "infer from withered flowers the hour of their bloom".

He was awarded the Archaeological Institute of America's Gold Medal for Distinguished Archaeological Achievement in 1970, and a scholarship for undergraduate humanities majors at Washington University is named in Mylonas' honor. His daughter, Ione Mylonas Shear (1936–2005), was also a renowned archaeologist. Another daughter, Eunice Hale, married the artist and teacher Robert Beverly Hale, and they had two children, Alexander Hale and Evelyn Hale.

Works
Mylonas' works include: The Balkan States; An Introduction to Their History (1946) -- written in response to what he felt were inaccuracies being taught to his son in school; Mycenae: The Capital City of Agamemnon (1957); Eleusis and the Eleusinian Mysteries (1961); Mycenae and the Mycenaean Age (1966); Grave Circle B of Mycenae (1972); Mycenae, A Guide to Its Ruins and Its History (1981); and Mycenae Rich in Gold (1983).

Notes

References
Dessy, Raymond. Exile From Olynthus, Women in Archaeology.com, Mentoring and Networking, Greece, 1927-1928, Virginia Tech (October 2, 2006).

Fuller, Neathery, "Professor George E. Mylonas: Expedition to Mycenae", (October 2, 2006).
[Necrology] Spyros Iakovidis in American Journal of Archaeology 93 (1989) 235-237.
"Obituary for Ione M. Shear" (October 2, 2006).
Carl W. Conrad, Department of Classics/Washington University (October 2, 2006).
"The Slaying of Metropolitan Chrysostomos" (November 4, 2006).
"Translating Greece", St. Petersburg Times, October 13, 2002, (October 2, 2006).
Interviews with family members conducted 2006.
Personal archives and cross-references at the American School of Classical Studies at Athens: http://www.ascsa.edu.gr/index.php/archives/george-mylonas-papers

Mylonas, George E.
1898 births
1988 deaths
Greek emigrants to the United States
National and Kapodistrian University of Athens alumni
Johns Hopkins University alumni
Washington University in St. Louis faculty
Smyrniote Greeks
Mycenaean archaeologists
Greek military personnel of the Greco-Turkish War (1919–1922)
Greek prisoners of war
Members of the Academy of Athens (modern)
20th-century archaeologists
Presidents of the Archaeological Institute of America
Emigrants from the Ottoman Empire to Greece
University of Chicago faculty